Blaž Kavčič was the defending champion, but he chose to compete at the French Open instead.Björn Phau won in the final 7–6(8–6), 2–6, 6–2, against Carlos Berlocq.

Seeds

Draw

Finals

Top half

Bottom half

References
 Main Draw
 Qualifying Draw

Alessandria Challenger - Singles
Alessandria Challenger